Ernst von Below was a German general who served in the Imperial German Army and participated World War I. He also commanded several Sea Battalions and briefly headed the Schutztruppe.

Early life and early military service 
Ernst von Below was born on 17 April 1863 in Königsberg as the son of Prussian Generalmajor Ferdinand von Below. After being a cadet he joined the Prussian Army in 1881 as a Fähnrich, and a year later was commissioned a second lieutenant in the infantry. He entered the Prussian Staff College in 1890 and was promoted to premier lieutenant in the same year. In 1894, von Below was promoted to Hauptmann. In 1899 he was commandeered to the Infantry Training Battalion, attached to the 1st Foot Guard Regiment. Later he transferred to the 4th Guards Grenadiers as a company commander. From 1 April 1903 von Below served as an adjutant to Prince Joachim Albert of Prussia. On 6 May 1903 he was assigned as his personal adjutant and on 27 January 1904 he was promoted to major. Von Below left the staff on 13 September 1906, when he was appointed commander of the 2nd Battalion of the 91st Infantry Regiment. On 4 April 1908 he became commander of the 2nd Sea Battalion in Wilhelmshaven, and later would lead his unit in Tsingtao. He was promoted to lieutenant colonel on 20 March 1911. After his return to Germany, from 22 March 1912 von Below was in command of the 3rd Sea Battalion in Cuxhaven. On 27 January 1913 he transferred to the 1st Guard Grenadier Regiment. With his promotion to colonel on 1 October 1913, he was appointed commander of the 153rd Infantry Regiment in Altenburg. Six months later von Below moved to the Reichskolonialamt as nominal commander of the Schutztruppe.

World War I 
After World War I broke out von Below became commander of the 27th Infantry Regiment, and shortly later successively of the 26th and 39th Reserve Infantry brigades. In May 1915 he was chosen to lead the new 2nd Jäger Brigade. In 1917 he was promoted to Generalmajor and became the commander of 200th Infantry Division. He was awarded the prestigious Pour le Mérite on 24 November 1917, and received the oak leaves on 13 October 1918.

Post war and death 
After war he got the character of a Generalleutnant. On the Tannenbergtag, the commemoration day of the Battle of Tannenberg, in 1939 he got the character of a General der Infanterie. He died in 1955 in Schleusingen.

References 

1863 births
1955 deaths
Military personnel from Königsberg
German Army generals of World War I
Major generals of Prussia
German untitled nobility
Recipients of the Pour le Mérite (military class)
Recipients of the Iron Cross (1914), 1st class
Recipients of the Iron Cross (1914), 2nd class
Schutztruppe personnel
Below family